Maros-Torda was an administrative county (comitatus) of the Kingdom of Hungary. Its territory is now in central Romania (eastern Transylvania) and has been administratively succeeded by county Mureș which consist of about half the territory of the previous Maros-Torda administrative county. Its county seat was Marosvásárhely (present-day Târgu Mureș).

Geography

Maros-Torda county shared borders with the Hungarian counties Kolozs, Beszterce-Naszód, Csík, Udvarhely, Kis-Küküllő and Torda-Aranyos. The river Mureș flowed through the county. Its area was 4,188 km2 around 1910.

History
Maros-Torda county was formed in 1876 on the territory of the Székely seat of Marosszék and part of Torda County. In 1920, after the Treaty of Trianon, the county became part of Romania, except after the Second Vienna Award, between 1940 until the end of World War II, when much of the county's territory was awarded to Hungary. Today, its territory lies in the present (larger) Romanian county Mureș.

Demographics

Subdivisions

Around 1910, the subdivisions of Maros-Torda county were:

Notes

See also
 Torda County

References 

States and territories established in 1940
States and territories disestablished in 1920
States and territories disestablished in 1945
Kingdom of Hungary counties in Transylvania